Indian calendar may refer to any of the calendars, used for civil and religious purposes in India and other parts of Southeast Asia:
 The Indian national calendar (a variant of the Shalivahana calendar), the calendar officially used by the Government of India.
 Hindu calendars
 Vikram calendar
 Jain calendar
 Tamil calendar
 Bengali calendar
 Malayalam calendar
 Assamese calendar
 Maithili calendar
 Meitei calendar
 Odia calendar
 Punjabi calendar
 Nanakshahi calendar
 Tripuri calendar
 Tulu calendar